The Mice were a Cleveland-based power-pop trio active in the mid-80s. Brothers Bill Fox and Tommy Fox played with Bill's high school friends and performed music in various minor and untitled lineups. Together with a friend who would not end up in the band's final lineup, two recordings were made which appeared on a self-released ("Mouse Tunes") 500-copy 7" single, Can You Walk on the Water Baby?. An ad was placed in the newspaper that read closely to "Mice seek bassist. No metalheads!" and after the responses came in, Fox chose bassist Ken Hall to complete the trio's lineup. An EP was made on the Herb Jackson Record label called For Almost Ever, recorded in 1985, containing the song "Not Proud of the USA", which would receive considerable airplay on freeform station WFMU during the Bush presidential administration. The EP was followed up a year later with the full-length LP entitled Scooter on the St. Valentine record label. Scooter was also released in the UK on the What Goes On label.

The Mice played numerous Cleveland venues, performing a mix of their own songs as well as covers from The Who, The Beatles, The Ramones, and others. After touring the Midwest, they broke up when lead singer/songwriter/guitarist Bill Fox left the band, leaving behind the half-finished Canterbury Bells LP (which never saw a release) and canceling plans for a European tour. 

In 2004, Scat Records released a reissue CD called For Almost Ever Scooter, which compiled together the two Mice professional releases, the For Almost Ever EP and the Scooter LP. The reissue CD was supposed to include the nine completed songs from the Canterbury Bells LP and selections of a live performance from Cleveland radio WRUW's Live From Cleveland show, but the extra material was taken out at the last minute at the band's request.

The Mice song "Bye Bye Kitty Cat" was covered by Superchunk on a 2014 Merge reissue of Indoor Living.

Discography
"Can You Walk on the Water Baby?" / "Little Creatures" (Self-released Mouse Tunes, 1984)
For Almost Ever (Herb Jackson, 1985)
Scooter (St. Valentine Records, 1986)
"Little Rage" (The Mice) / "House Fall Down" (Yo La Tengo) (What Goes On Records, 1987)
Jim Clevo Presents – Listen (cassette compilation, Label Unknown, 1987)
For Almost Ever Scooter (Scat Records, 2004)
Unreleased and Live Recordings (Scat Records, 2004)

References 

American power pop groups
Musical groups from Cleveland
Scat Records artists